Ganem is a surname and given name which may refer to:

Surname
 Donald Ganem (born 1950), American physician and virologist 
 Edy Ganem, American actress

Given name
 Ganem W. Washburn (1823–1907), American lawyer, judge, and politician

See also
 Ghanem, another given name and surname